Now Museum, Now You Don't may refer to:

 Now Museum-Now You Don't, an episode of The Venture Bros.
 Now Museum, Now You Don't, an episode of The Simpsons
 Now Museum, Now You Don't, an episode of 1990's Bill & Ted's Excellent Adventures
 Now Museum, Now You Don't, an episode of A Pup Named Scooby-Doo
 Now Museum, Now You Don't, a 1997 animated Tamagotchi video
 What Do You Think of Ukiyoe Blues? (Now Museum, Now You Don't), an episode of Lupin III Part II
 Now Museum: Now You Don't, a 2002 album by Andy Dixon